The Bangabandhu Aeronautical Center, or BAC is a Bangladeshi state-owned major defense contractor and aerospace, arms, defense and advanced technology company headquartered in Kurmitola, Dhaka. It was formed by Ministry of Defence in 2011, and is managed by Bangladesh Air Force.

BAC is among the largest defense contractor in aerospace, military support, and security provider for Bangladesh military.

The corporation is primarily involved in designs, modernization, integration, and assembly of aircraft and avionics systems for the Bangladesh military. Mainly focusing on avionics, aviation, and high-tech military technologies for the Air Force, BAC also operates a division for development and maintenance of systems for the Army and Navy such as radar, unmanned aerial vehicle and other defense systems. The corporation is strictly restricted from exporting any technologies or products without consent to the Ministry of Defence and Air Force.

Operations
The center was established in 2011 with an aim to establish indigenous maintenance facilities for all aircraft of the Bangladesh Air Force. As per Forces Readiness Goal 2030, the goal was to maintain the maximum number of aircraft in service, and minimize dependency on foreign suppliers.

214 Maintenance, Repairing and Overhauling (MRO) Unit

214 Maintenance, Repairing and Overhauling (MRO) Unit is primarily dedicated towards overhauling and maintenance of the Chinese Chengdu F-7 fighter jets in service with the Bangladesh Air Force (BAF). The unit achieved capability of overhauling and manufacturing parts for the aircraft in 2018.  Currently, Bangladesh Air Force boasts 57 F-7 aircraft in its inventory, 36 of them in service. Implementation of F-7 overhauling factory minimized approximately 30 to 40 percent of cost on overhauling and maintenance, while shortening overhauling period from a year to 8 months.

Grob G 120TP Workshop
In 2021, Outgoing Chief of Air Staff Masihuzzaman Serniabat disclosed a deal between BAF and Grob Aircraft for 24 Grob G 120TP basic trainer. During his speech, he revealed that as per contract, the German manufacturer will set up Composite Material Repair Workshop and Propeller Repair Workshop. The workshops will be designed to maintain  turboprop aircraft in BAF inventory, including ones with Rolce Royce turboprop engines.

References

Bangladesh Air Force
Aerospace research institutes
Defence companies of Bangladesh
Companies based in Dhaka